N3 may refer to:

Roads
 N3 (Bangladesh), connecting Dhaka and Mymensingh
 N3 road (Belgium), one of the national roads in Belgium
 N3 road (Gabon)
 N3 road (Ghana)
 N3 road (Ireland), a National Primary Route
 N3 motorway (Netherlands), one of the national roads in the Netherlands
 N3 road (Senegal), one of the national roads in Senegal
 N3 (South Africa), a road connecting Johannesburg to Durban
 Route nationale 3, France

Transportation
 , a Royal Navy battleship design that was never built
 , a 1915 coastal defense submarine of the US Navy
 SP&S Class N-3, a steam locomotives class from the Spokane, Portland and Seattle Locomotive Roster
 N3, gauges for monitoring a third section in a triple spool jet engine

 N3, IATA code for the Russian airline Omskavia
 N3, European large goods vehicles above 12 tonnes

Science and technology
 Haplogroup N (Y-DNA), a former human Y-chromosomal haplogroup, now N1c
 n-3, Omega-3 fatty acid
 N3−, an azide anion in chemistry
 N3 Lung cancer, metastasis to certain lymph nodes
 N3, the genus three non orientable surface
 N3, cis-bis(isothiocyanato)bis(2,2'-bipyridyl-4,4'-dicarboxylato)ruthenium(II), a red dye in dye-sensitized solar cells
N3, abbreviation for the 3 nanometer process node in semiconductor technology

Other
 N3 (Calgary), condominium building
 N3 (NHS), the national broadband network for the English National Health Service
 Notation3, or N3 rules, a textual notation for the Resource Description Framework
 N3, the third level of the Japanese-Language Proficiency Test
 N3, the most recent version of the Nagravision conditional access system for cable and satellite television
 N3, a postcode district in the N postcode area in London
 N3, the former name of NDR Fernsehen, a German television channel

See also
 N03, the ICD-10 code for Nephritic syndrome
 ATC code N03, Antiepileptics, a subgroup of the Anatomical Therapeutic Chemical Classification System
 List of highways numbered 3
 N road (disambiguation)